The Cisnes River (Spanish for swan) is a river located in the Aysén del General Carlos Ibáñez del Campo Region of the Chilean Patagonia. It runs in east-west direction from the mountains near the border to Argentina and empties into the Pacific Ocean, near the town of Puerto Cisnes at Puyuhuapi Channel. 
Its characteristic turquoise-blue color is due to the glacial sediments deposited in it. Moro River and Pinchado River are some of the major tributaries of the river.

See also
 List of rivers of Chile

References

Rivers of Chile
Rivers of Aysén Region